The Richmond Union Passenger Railway, in Richmond, Virginia, was the first practical electric trolley (tram) system, and set the pattern for most subsequent electric trolley systems around the world. It is an IEEE milestone in engineering.

The Richmond system was not the first attempt to operate an electric trolley. According to the IEEE, there were at least 74 earlier attempts to provide electric trolley service in over 60 communities in North America, the United Kingdom, and continental Europe. However, these earlier attempts were not reliable enough to replace the existing animal-hauled street railways.

The Richmond system was designed by Frank Julian Sprague. After trials in late 1887, it began regular operation on February 2, 1888, with 10 streetcars. Electric power was supplied through overhead trolley wires (450 volts) for two  motors on each car.

Its success proved that electric traction was both safe and reliable. The Boston City Council, after inspecting Richmond's system on September 7, 1888, approved construction the second such project by the West End Street Railway. Boston's trolley was closely patterned upon Richmond's, and again demonstrated its practicality.

Richmond's electric trolley service ended on November 25, 1949. It would not be until 2018 that the city would once again be served by rapid transit, when the GRTC Pulse opened.

Location

See also 
 List of streetcar systems in the United States (Virginia)
 List of IEEE milestones
 "Rails in Richmond", by Carlton N McKenney.  Old Dominion Chapter, Nat. Railway H.S. (January 1, 1986).

References 

 

Light rail in Virginia
Railway companies established in 1888
Railway companies disestablished in 1949
Transportation in Richmond, Virginia
American companies disestablished in 1949
American companies established in 1888